Himmat Aur Mehanat is a 1987 Indian Hindi-language drama film, produced by B. S. Shaad under the BRAR Productions banner and directed by K. Bapaiah. It stars Jeetendra, Sridevi in the pivotal roles and music composed by Bappi Lahiri. The film is a remake of the Telugu film Pachani Samsaram (1970).

Plot
Nurse Jyoti gets hired by a wealthy male, Madan, wins his confidence, and is permitted to virtually run the entire household. When Madan's son, Vijay Kumar, returns from New York, he sexually molests then eventually marries her. Then differences arise between her and Madan, and despite the birth of a son, escalate to the point when Madan and Vijay both accuse her of having an affair with another male, leaving her no choice but to leave the household. Vijay has a change of heart and goes to visit his son and estranged wife, but is shocked to find that they are not alone, and she has had another son.

Cast
 Shammi Kapoor as Madanlal
 Jeetendra as Vijay 
 Sridevi as Jyoti
 Poonam Dhillon as Sharda
 Divya Rana as Sona
 Raj Kiran as Raja
 Shakti Kapoor as Mahesh Chand
 Kader Khan as Trilok Chand
 Satyendra Kapoor as Madhav 
 Asrani as Paplu
 Rajesh Puri as Daplu
 Iftekhar as Doctor
 Shubha Khote as Sona's Mother
 Yunus Parvez as Kalra

Soundtrack
Songs like "Chhuee Muee, Chhuee Muee Ho Gayi", "Touch Me, Touch Me", "Mumbai Roke To Roke" were sung and picturized well and became popular. Indeevar wrote all songs.

External links

1980s Hindi-language films
1987 films
Films directed by K. Bapayya
Films scored by Bappi Lahiri
Hindi remakes of Telugu films